Krasnaya Rechka is the name of several rural localities in Russia:
Krasnaya Rechka, Republic of Karelia, a village in Kondopozhsky District of the Republic of Karelia
Krasnaya Rechka, Kirov Oblast, a settlement in Kobrinsky Rural Okrug of Nagorsky District in Kirov Oblast; 
Krasnaya Rechka, Krasnoyarsk Krai, a village in Krasnozavodskoy Selsoviet of Bogotolsky District in Krasnoyarsk Krai
Krasnaya Rechka, Leningrad Oblast, a village under the administrative jurisdiction of Yefimovskoye Settlement Municipal Formation in Boksitogorsky District of Leningrad Oblast; 
Krasnaya Rechka, Novotoryalsky District, Mari El Republic, a village in Chuksolinsky Rural Okrug of Novotoryalsky District in the Mari El Republic; 
Krasnaya Rechka, Orshansky District, Mari El Republic, a selo in Shulkinsky Rural Okrug of Orshansky District in the Mari El Republic; 
Krasnaya Rechka, Shakhunya, Nizhny Novgorod Oblast, a village in Tumaninsky Selsoviet under the administrative jurisdiction of the town of oblast significance of Shakhunya in Nizhny Novgorod Oblast; 
Krasnaya Rechka, Ardatovsky District, Nizhny Novgorod Oblast, a settlement in Lichadeyevsky Selsoviet of Ardatovsky District in Nizhny Novgorod Oblast; 
Krasnaya Rechka, Dergachyovsky District, Saratov Oblast, a selo in Dergachyovsky District of Saratov Oblast
Krasnaya Rechka, Novoburassky District, Saratov Oblast, a selo in Novoburassky District of Saratov Oblast
Krasnaya Rechka, Pugachyovsky District, Saratov Oblast, a selo in Pugachyovsky District of Saratov Oblast
Krasnaya Rechka, Zabaykalsky Krai, a settlement in Ulyotovsky District of Zabaykalsky Krai

See also
Krasnenkaya Rechka Municipal Okrug, a municipal okrug in Kirovsky District of the federal city of St. Petersburg